The 2022 New Year's Smash was the third New Year's Smash professional wrestling television special produced by All Elite Wrestling (AEW). It took place on December 28, 2022, at the 1stBank Center in Broomfield, Colorado. The two-part event was broadcast as special episodes of AEW's weekly television programs, Wednesday Night Dynamite and Friday Night Rampage. Dynamite aired live on TBS while Rampage aired on tape delay on December 30 on TNT.

Production

Background
New Year's Smash is a two-part television special held around New Year's by All Elite Wrestling (AEW) since January 2021. On October 18, 2022, AEW announced that the third New Year's Smash would return live on December 28 for Wednesday Night Dynamite on TBS and an episode of Friday Night Rampage that would air on tape delay on December 30 on TNT. The event took place at the 1stBank Center in Broomfield, Colorado.

Storylines
New Year's Smash featured professional wrestling matches that involved different wrestlers from pre-existing scripted feuds and storylines. Wrestlers portrayed heroes, villains, or less distinguishable characters in scripted events that built tension and culminated in a wrestling match or series of matches. Storylines were produced on AEW's weekly television programs, Dynamite and Rampage, the supplementary online streaming shows, Dark and Elevation, and The Young Bucks' YouTube series Being The Elite.

At Full Gear, Death Triangle (Pac, Penta El Zero Miedo, and Rey Fénix) defeated The Elite (Kenny Omega, Matt Jackson, and Nick Jackson) to retain the AEW World Trios Championship. Afterwards, it was announced that the Full Gear match was the first in a Best of Seven Series for the championship. Death Triangle would again defeat The Elite on the following episode of Dynamite, but The Elite gained a win on the next week's episode. At Winter Is Coming, Death Triangle secured another win to lead the series at 3–1. The Elite then gained another win at Dynamite: Holiday Bash to bring the series to 3–2, with the sixth match scheduled for Dynamite: New Year's Smash as a Falls Count Anywhere match.

Aftermath
With The Elite's (Kenny Omega, Matt Jackson, and Nick Jackson) win over Death Triangle (Pac, Penta El Zero Miedo, and Rey Fénix), the series tied at 3–3. The seventh and final match took place on the January 11, 2023 episode of Dynamite as a ladder match where The Elite defeated Death Triangle to become two-time AEW World Trios Champions.

Results

References

External links

2020s American television specials
2022 American television episodes
2022 in professional wrestling
All Elite Wrestling shows
Events in Broomfield, Colorado
December 2022 events in the United States
Professional wrestling shows in Colorado
Holidays themed professional wrestling events